Benjamín Palencia (7 July 1894 − 16 January 1980) was a Spanish painter and draftsman from Barrax, Albacete. Most notably he became known as co-founder of the School of Vallecas, together with the sculptor Alberto Sánchez Pérez. The quintessence of the large body of his work is perhaps the poetry of the Castilian landscape as defined by the Generation of '98.

References

External links
Website of the artist 
Artist's profile on artnet.com

Abstract painters
Spanish surrealist artists
Modern painters
1894 births
1980 deaths
20th-century Spanish painters
20th-century Spanish male artists
Spanish male painters
Spanish language